Rafiqul Alam is a Bangladeshi musician. He was an artist of Swadhin Bangla Betar Kendra in 1971. He is also a playback singer. As of 2013, he had recorded over 300 playback songs for films. Alam received the Bangladesh National Film Award two times and the Cine Journalists' Association Award.

Early life and career
Alam's grew up in Rajshahi. His elder brother Sarwar Jahan was a locally renowned singer. He was trained under Pandit Haripada Das, Abdul Jabbar and Ustad Sagiruddin Khan of Kolkata. He learnt Rabindra Sangeet and songs of Atul Prasad from Kanika Bandopadhyay and Ajit Roy.

In 1973, Alam performed in a concert held at the Dhaka Stadium, organized by the Bangladesh Music College.

Personal life
Alam is married to singer Abida Sultana.

References

Living people
People from Rajshahi District
Recipients of the National Film Awards (Bangladesh)
20th-century Bangladeshi male singers
20th-century Bangladeshi singers
21st-century Bangladeshi male singers
21st-century Bangladeshi singers
Year of birth missing (living people)